Witton Country Park is a 480-acre (1.9 km²) public park in the west of Blackburn, Lancashire, England. Around half of the country park is mixed woodland and parkland, while the rest is either farmland or rough grassland with open access. A visitors' centre features stables with exhibitions of old horse-drawn farm machinery, farm hand-tools and a natural history room. A mammal centre houses shrews, voles, ferrets, rabbits and other animals, which are on display.

History
Witton House and its gardens were created for Joseph Feilden in 1800. Lieutenant General Randle Joseph Feilden, his second son, was a member of parliament. The estate was used by the British Army in both world wars and then, in 1946, thanks in part due to a large donation by Robert Edward Hart, it was acquired by Blackburn Council. After dry rot was found the house was demolished in 1952.

On 11 April 2011, Prince William and Catherine Middleton visited Witton Country Park and greeted the Blackburn Harriers and Athletic Club.

Events in the park
Each year, two events, "Arts in the Park" and "Blackburn with Darwen Mela", take place. These events formerly took place in Corporation Park, but moved to Witton Park in 2005. "Arts in the Park" sees local bands playing, as well as more famous acts such as Liberty X. Also many other events take place throughout the day, which usually ends with a set performed by an orchestra. The park is also the venue for the annual Blackburn Race for Life charity fundraising event.

See also
Witton Park Academy

References

External links 
 Witton Country Park on Blackburn with Darwen Borough Council website
 Footage from the 2011 Race for Life event

Parks and commons in Blackburn with Darwen
Country parks in Lancashire